Diuris gregaria, commonly known as clumping golden moths is a species of orchid that is endemic to Victoria. It between three and seven leaves and one or two bright yellow flowers with a few dark striations and usually grows in dense tufts of up to thirty plants. It is a rare species mostly only found in grassland west of Melbourne.

Description
Diuris gregaria is a tuberous, perennial herb which often grows in densely crowded tufts of up to thirty plants. There are two dark yellow, pimply callus ridges near the mid-line of the labellum. Flowering occurs in September and October.

Taxonomy and naming
Diuris gregaria was first formally described in 2006 by David Jones from a specimen collected near Derrinallum and the description was published in Australian Orchid Research. The specific epithet (gregaria) is a Latin word meaning "pertaining to a flock or herd", referring to the clumping habit of this species.

Distribution and habitat
Clumping golden moths grows in grassland on the basalt plains in western Victoria.

Conservation
This orchid is classed as "endangered" under the Victorian government Flora and Fauna Guarantee Act 1988. Its range has been reduced by farming and agriculture.

References

gregaria
Endemic orchids of Australia
Orchids of Victoria (Australia)
Plants described in 2006